Burik or Burick is a surname of Ukrainian origin. Notable people with the surname include:

Jason Burik, American Lego artist
Dick van Burik (born 1973), retired Dutch footballer
Si Burick (1909–1986), sports editor

It can also refer to:
Burik, Philippine tattoos of the Ilocano people

References